The Iranian Futsal Super League (SuperLig-e Futsāl-e Irān), is a professional futsal league competition for clubs located at the highest level of the Iranian futsal league system founded in 2003.

The Super League is the top tier of an extensive pyramid-like structure, above the 1st Division, the 2nd Division and the lower local leagues.

Champions

List of champions by season

Most successful clubs

All-time Futsal Super League 
Since the 2003–04 season.

Players

Transfer season
 The summer transfer season for teams in the Super League lasts from June 8 to 12pm on July 16.

Rules and regulations
The Iranian Futsal Clubs who participate Futsal Super League are allowed to have up to maximum 30 players (including up to maximum 3 non-Iranian players) in their player lists, which was categorized in the following groups
 Up to maximum 16 adult (over 23 year old) players
 Up to maximum 4 under-23 players.
 Up to maximum 7 under-20 players.
 Up to maximum 3 under-18 players.

Notable foreign players

Records

Winning managers

Multiple winning managers

Multiple winning players

See also
 Iran Futsal's 1st Division
 Iran Futsal's 2nd Division
 Iranian Futsal Hazfi Cup
 Iran's Premier Football League
 Azadegan League
 Iran Football's 2nd Division
 Iran Football's 3rd Division
 Iranian Super Cup
 Hazfi Cup

References

External links 
  Iran Futsal League on PersianLeague.com 
   فوتسال نیوز 
  I.R. Iran Football Federation
  Super League page on Futsal Planet

 
2004 establishments in Iran
1
Top level futsal leagues in Asia
Sports leagues established in 2004
Professional sports leagues in Iran